Mount Danum is a mountain located at the Tawau Division of Sabah, Malaysia.

References 

Danum
Protected areas of Sabah
Hiking trails in Malaysia
Tawau Division